Luke Perry (born 20 November 1995) is an Australian professional volleyball player. He is a member of the Australia national team. At the professional club level, he plays for Trefl Gdańsk.

Career
He began playing volleyball in 2009 for his school. In late 2012, he accepted a scholarship to the AIS (Australian Institute of Sport), in Canberra, where he began training full-time in volleyball. In 2013, he was selected as part of the Volleyroos. He played for Team Lakkapää in Finland in 2014–2015, and then in 2015–2016 joined VfB Friedrichshafen in Germany. In 2018, he joined Asseco Resovia.

Honours

Clubs
 CEV Cup
  2021/2022 – with Tours VB

 National championships
 2015/2016  German SuperCup, with Berlin Recycling Volleys
 2016/2017  German Championship, with Berlin Recycling Volleys 
 2017/2018  German Championship, with Berlin Recycling Volleys

References

External links
 
 Player profile at PlusLiga.pl 
 Player profile at Volleybox.net

1995 births
Living people
Sportspeople from Perth, Western Australia
Australian men's volleyball players
Australian expatriate sportspeople in Finland
Expatriate volleyball players in Finland
Australian expatriate sportspeople in Germany
Expatriate volleyball players in Germany
Australian expatriate sportspeople in Poland
Expatriate volleyball players in Poland
Australian expatriate sportspeople in France
Expatriate volleyball players in France
Resovia (volleyball) players
Tours Volley-Ball players
Trefl Gdańsk players
Liberos